Barbados was represented at the 2006 Commonwealth Games in Melbourne.

Medals

Bronze
 Anderson Fitzgerald Emmanuel, Boxing, Heavyweight 91 kg

Barbados' Commonwealth Games Team 2006

Field Hockey

Women's team
 Lana Als
 Ann-Marie Alleyne
 Dionne Clarke
 Joana Davis
 Chiaka Drakes
 Deborah-Ann Holder
 Maria Browne
 Reyna Farnum
 Tricia-Ann Greaves
 Patrina Braithwaite
 Allison Haynes
 Cher King
 Lisa Crichlow
 Charlia Warner
 Nicole Tempro
 Tara Howard

Swimming
Bradley Ally
Andrei Cross
Alexis Jordan
Nicholas Neckles

References

See also
Barbados at the 2007 Pan American Games

Nations at the 2006 Commonwealth Games
Commonwealth Games
2006